Pranee Kitipongpitaya (born 9 August 1942) is a Thai athlete. She competed in the women's discus throw at the 1964 Summer Olympics.

References

1942 births
Living people
Athletes (track and field) at the 1964 Summer Olympics
Pranee Kitipongpitaya
Pranee Kitipongpitaya
Place of birth missing (living people)